The 1997 Fangoria Chainsaw Awards, presented by Fangoria magazine and Creation Entertainment, honored the best horror films of 1996.

Ceremony
There was no ceremony to commemorate the occasion, as the annual Los Angeles Weekend of Horrors event was cancelled (originally scheduled for May 31, 1997 at the LAX Wyndham).

Winners and nominees

Awards

Fangoria Hall of Fame Award
Jamie Lee Curtis
Stuart Gordon

External links
 1997 Fangoria Chainsaw Award Winners

Fangoria Chainsaw Awards
Fangoria Chainsaw Awards
Fangoria Chainsaw Awards
1997 in Los Angeles
1997 in American cinema